Miss Mexico is a national Beauty pageant in Mexico. It is responsible for selecting the country's delegates to international beauty contests: Miss World, Mister World, and other minor international pageants such as Miss Supranational, Miss Grand International and Miss United Continents.

In association with Telemax and Televisa, the Miss México pageant directed by Hugo Castellanos is one of biggest pageants in Mexico; 32 women from 31 states and Mexico D.F. compete for the title of Miss México or Miss World Mexico. The 2016 Miss México was crowned in the Teatro José María Morelos at Morelia, Michoacan, in September 2016.

Since 2013, Miss Mexico pageant has been responsible to send delegates to Miss Supranational and Miss United Continents (before Miss American Continent), all of them from Jalisco. In 2016 acquired the franchise to select the Mexican delegate for Miss World and Mister World after Lupita Jones lost this franchise.

Titleholders
Below are the names of the annual titleholders of Miss México, the states they represented and the venue which played host to their crowning, in ascending order. Titleholders whose names appear highlighted went on to win a major international pageant.

Representatives at international pageants
Below are the names of the delegates enlisted by the Miss México Organization to represent the country at major worldwide beauty contests. They are listed according to the year in which they participated in their respective international pageants, which do not always coincide with when their national crowning took place.

Color key

Miss World

Miss Supranational

Miss Grand International

Miss Continentes Unidos

Top Model of the World

Reinado Internacional del Café

Miss Costa Maya

Miss Global City

Representatives at male international pageants

Mister World

Mister Supranational

References 

Beauty pageants in Mexico
Mexican culture
Mexico
Mexico
2016 establishments in Mexico